is a railway station on the Hokuriku Railroad Ishikawa Line, in the city of Kanazawa, Ishikawa, Japan, operated by the private railway operator Hokuriku Railroad.

Lines

Station layout
The station consists of two bay platforms serving two tracks.

Adjacent stations

History

Nomachi Station opened on 1 October 1922. The station became the terminus of the Ishikawa Line when the section between Nomachi and Shiragikuchō was closed on September 20, 1972.

Surrounding area
 Tsudakoma Corporation Headquarters
 Fujitsu Hokuriku Systems Headquarters
 Ishikawa Prefectural Kanazawa Central High School
 Kanazawa Tatsuizumi Junior High School
 Apita Kanazawa Shop
 Manten Spa Kanazawa
 Nishi Chaya (Old town)
 Ninja Temple
 Nomachi Station branch office
 APA Hotel Kanazawa Nomachi

See also
 List of railway stations in Japan

References

External links

 Nomachi Station information 

Railway stations in Ishikawa Prefecture
Railway stations in Japan opened in 1922
Hokuriku Railroad Ishikawa Line